Chendor is a town located in Kuantan District, Pahang, Malaysia. Chendor is a famous for their beach and resort for tourists.

References

External links

Tourist attractions in Pahang
Populated places in Pahang
Towns in Pahang